With You is the third studio album by American singer Stacy Lattisaw. Released on June 22, 1981, by Cotillion Records, Lattisaw break-through single, a cover of the Moments's hit "Love on a Two-Way Street", peaked at number twenty-six on the U.S. pop chart and number two on the U.S. R&B chart in 1981.

Track listing
"Feel My Love Tonight" – (Frank Martin, Narada Michael Walden, Randy Jackson, Allee Willis, Andre Knox, Charles Chapman, Wayne Wallace)  4:08
"Screamin' Off the Top" – (Walden, Jackson, Bunny Hull) – 4:27
"It Was So Easy" – (Julie Reeder, Billy Thomas, Bobby Reeder) – 3:15
"Baby I Love You" – (Walden, Jackson, Willis) – 4:34
"Love on a Two-Way Street" – (Bert Keyes, Sylvia Robinson) – 4:08
"With You" – (Walden, Jeff Cohen) – 4:46
"Young Girl" – (T. M. Stevens, Gavin Christopher, Lisa Walden, Walden) – 4:33
"Spotlight" – (Alan Glass, Preston Glass) – 4:45
"You Take Me to Heaven" – (Walden) – 4:09

Charts

Singles

References

External links
 Stacy Lattisaw-With You at Discogs

1981 albums
Stacy Lattisaw albums
Albums produced by Narada Michael Walden
Atlantic Records albums